= Kheri Ram Nagar =

- village
- Location in Haryana, India Kheri Ram Nagar (India)
- Coordinates: 29.937434°N 76.850660°E
- Country: India
- State: Haryana
- District: Kurukshetra

Languages
  - Official: Hindi
- Time zone: UTC+5:30 (IST)
- PIN: 136038
- Telephone code: 01744
- ISO 3166 code: IN-HR
- Vehicle registration: HR-65
- Nearest city: Kurukshetra
- Lok Sabha constituency: Kurukshetra
- Vidhan Sabha constituency: Thanesar
- Website: haryana.gov.in

Kheri Ram Nagar is a village situated in Haryana state of India in District Kurukshetra. This is a small village having about 3500 people living in it.

The village has a Government Middle School.

The land surrounding the village is fertile, and the main occupation of the villagers is Agriculture. The people living in village are mainly Hindu by religion.

== History ==
Kheri Ram Nagar was founded by Ch.Naanu Ji between 1840 and 1860. He was arrived from a nearby village named "Mathana" from a Kanyan gotra, which is in the same district, Kurukshetra. The village is still called "Naanu wali Kheri" by village elders.

Sarpanch/Pardhan -

Ch.Munshi Ram,

Ch.Kaabaj Singh,

Ch.Kuldeep Singh,

Ch.Sher Singh Sher,

Ch.Kuldeep Singh,

Smt.Nirmal Devi Verma,

Sh. Natha Ram,

Smt.Shailes Devi

Smt.Sunita Devi - Present
